Archduchess Assunta of Austria ;(10 August 1902 – 24 January 1993) was the youngest daughter of Archduke Leopold Salvator of Austria and  Infanta Blanca of Spain. She was a member of the Tuscan branch of the Imperial House of Habsburg, an Archduchess of Austria and Princess of Tuscany by birth. Born and raised in the twilight years of the Austrian Empire, Archduchess Assunta lived in exile in Barcelona, Spain after the fall of the Habsburg monarchy.  She entered religious life in a convent in Barcelona, but was forced to leave it in 1936 due to disturbances during the Spanish Civil War. In 1939, she married Joseph Hopfinger, a Polish doctor. In 1942 the couple emigrated to the United States. Archduchess Assunta and her husband had two daughters, but they divorced in 1950. She moved to San Antonio, Texas  where she had a variety of jobs living in anonymity until her death.

Early life
Archduchess Assunta of Austria was born on 10 August 1902 in Vienna, Austria.  She was the eighth of ten children of  Archduke Leopold Salvator of Austria (1863–1931) and his wife Infanta Blanca of Spain (1868–1949).  She was given the baptismal names Assunta Alice Ferdinandine Blanca Leopoldina Margarethe Beatrix Raphaela Michaela Philomena.

Archduchess Assunta  grew up in the last period of the Habsburg monarchy. She was raised with her many brothers and sisters in the various properties owned by her parents enjoying a comfortable  and privileged life. Their main residence was the Palais Toskana in the  district of  Wieden in Viena with  Schloss Wilhelminenberg, on the Eastern slopes of the Gallitzinberg, in the Wienerwald Western parts of the Austrian capital as their country state.  Vacations were spent near Viareggio, Italy where Infanta Blanca owned, la Tenuata Real,  a rural property.  Theirs was a multicultural household as Assunta's paternal ancestors had reigned in Austria, Tuscany and the Kingdom of the Two Sicilies. Her maternal family had reigned in Spain, Parma, Modena, Portugal and France. 
The youngest of five sisters, Archduchess Assunta was raised paired with her sister Archduchess Maria Antonia.

Exile
Archduchess Assunta was sixteen years old at the fall of Habsburg monarchy following the end of World War I, which marked a sharpdown turn in her family's prosperity. The republican government of Austria confiscated  the properties of the Habsburgs, and the family lost their entire fortune. Assunta's eldest brothers, Archdukes Rainer and Leopold, remained in Austria and recognized the new republic, while the rest of the family moved to Spain in January  1919. They settled in Barcelona, living with simplicity as they had limited means. Assunta's three elder sisters, Archduchess Dolores, Inmaculata and Margaretha, were pliable; Archduchesses Assunta and Maria Antonia  were more rebellious and clashed often with their mother Infanta Blanca.

While living in Barcelona, Assunta, following in the footsteps of her sister, Maria Antonia, turned increasingly towards religion. Although their parents were observant Catholics, they found  their youngest daughter's religious fervor worrisome. Archduchess Maria Antonia abandoned  her desire to become a nun and married an impoverished Majorcan aristocrat, but Assunta remained adamant in her determination to become a nun. After running away on a ship to South America, Assumpta, still a minor, was returned to her parents who relented their opposition. With their permission, she eventually entered the convent of Santa Teresa de Tortosa near Barcelona.  At the outbreak of the Spanish civil war, the convent was attacked and the nuns were forced to flee for their lives. Those like Assunta, who had not yet taken their final vows, were free to follow a secular life. Assunta obtained permission to leave her order and joined her mother and unmarried siblings who were then living in Viareggio. In the late 1930s, through one of her brothers, Archduchess Assunta met Joseph Hopfinger (1905-1992), a Jewish Polish doctor. Against her mother's opposition, they married in September 1939 at Ouchy, Switzerland. Shortly after, her husband was called to service in the army until the fall of France when he was demobilized. They were reunited in London and moved to Barcelona where their eldest daughter, Teresa, was born in December 1940.

Later life
The German persecution of the Jews compelled Assunta, her husband, and their infant daughter to leave Europe. Both of her husband's parents were killed by the Russians, as their property was within the mineral-rich region of modern-day Lviv, Ukraine. As her husband was Jewish, they decided to emigrate to the United States with the help of Assunta's brothers Leopold and Franz Joseph, who were living in America and paid for their trip to New York. Assunta's husband worked as a doctor, and a second daughter was born in New York City in 1942.

Archduchess  Assumpta had two daughters from her marriage to Joseph Hopfinger:
 Maria Teresa Hopfinger b. 5 Dec 1940 ∞ (1961-1967) Edward Joseph Hetsko, Jr ∞ (1969-1970) Anatole Ferlet. She had two children.
 Juliet Elisabeth Maria Assunta Hopfinger b. 30 Oct 1942. Married five times.  She had three children.

However, the marriage was not a success.  Having married a European princess, Assunta's husband had hoped to inherit a fortune from his wife. As this never materialized, he became disenchanted with the marriage. The couple separated after the war, divorcing on 25 July 1950.

Archduchess Assunta moved with her daughters to San Antonio, Texas where she lived for the rest of her life. She remained very attached to the Catholic Church and held a variety of jobs to support herself and her two young children, including for some time working as a claim clerk.  Late in her life, she made one trip to Europe to visit her surviving siblings. She died on 24 January 1993 at age 90 in San Antonio, Texas.

Notes

Ancestry

Bibliography

Harding, Bertita. Lost Waltz: A Story of Exile. Bobbs-Merrill, 1944. ASIN: B0007DXCLY
McIntosh, David.  The Archduchess From Texas. The European Royal History Journal.  V 7.2,  April 2004.
McIntosh, David. The Unknown Habsburgs. Rosvall Royal Books, 2000. 

1902 births
1993 deaths
House of Habsburg-Lorraine
Austrian princesses